Ilarion (Jovan) Ruvarac (September 1, 1832 — August 8, 1905) was a Serbian historian and Orthodox priest, a member of the Serbian Academy of Sciences and Arts (first Serbian Learned Society and Serbian Royal Academy of Sciences). Ruvarac introduced the critical methods into Serbian historiography. He was archimandrite of Grgeteg monastery. His three brothers were all distinguished—the eldest, Lazar Ruvarac, as a high government official; the second, Kosta Ruvarac (1837–1864), as a writer and literary critic; and the youngest, Dimitrije Ruvarac, as a historian, Orthodox clergyman, politician and one of the most active publishers of his time.

Biography 
Jovan Ruvarac was born at Sremska Mitrovica on 1 September 1832 to Very Reverend Vasilije Ruvarac (1803–1873) and his wife Julijana, née Šević. He had three brothers, Lazar, Kosta and Dimitrije. His childhood was spent at Stari Slankamen and Stari Banovac in Srem, where he went to grammar school. In 1847 his family moved from Banovac to Karlovci and later to Vienna, where he completed his high school education at the Gymnasium of Karlovci and a gymnasium in Vienna before he enrolled at the University of Vienna's School of Law in 1852. At the same time, he studied history, a passion of his going back to high school days when two of his professors, Jakov Gerčić and Aleksandar Stojačković, instilled in him a curiosity that remained with him for the rest of his life. In Vienna in the early 1850s he met poet Branko Radičević, philologist Vuk Karadžić, and historian Leopold von Ranke. After graduating with a law degree in 1856, he enrolled at the Theological Seminary of Saint Arsenius (Sveti Arsenije) in Sremski Karlovci, graduating in 1859. Upon completing his studies in law, history, and theology, he decided to take holy orders and the new name of Ilarion on the date of his tonsure at Krušedol monastery on 1 January 1861. Under his new name (Ilarion), he published numerous historical studies that he had written up until then. Ruvarac was devoted to his scholastic work in history, and was hospitable to the many friends and strangers who found their way to Karlovci. He had great admiration for Vuk Karadžić and Đura Daničić, although their relation were never intimate. He met writer Jovan Subotić (1817–1886) in 1852 and their mutual admiration and respect for each other lasted until Subotić's death in 1886. He was appointed clerk of the Serbian Orthodox Ecclesiastical Court at Karlovci. In 1872 he became a member of the teaching staff at the Gymnasium of Karlovci, his Alma mater. He was elevated to the rank of Archimandrite at the Monastery of Grgeteg in 1874, and a year later, he was appointed rector of the Theological Seminary of Saint Arsenius in Karlovci. He was prominent in secular as well as religious works, interesting himself in every movement that promoted health, morality, or education, and especially serviceable as friendly, unofficial counsellor of all classes. His theology was that of a liberal high-churchman, and his sympathies were broad. In early 1880 he was commissioned to report on the state of education among Serbs in Austria-Hungary, and his able performance of this task brought him an offer of the bishopric of Karlovci, which he declined. In 1882 he decided to resume his monastic career as archimandrite of the Monastery of Grgeteg. The last years of his life were passed in complete seclusion at the monastery. He died there on the 8th of August 1905.

Ruvarac family
Ruvarac family settled in Syrmia in Austria-Hungary, today's Serbia, from the region between Bihać and Cazin, nowadays Bosnia and Herzegovina, then Ottoman Empire. His brother, Kosta Ruvarac (1837–1864), was a writer and literary critic who died while still a student at a university in Pest. Lazar Ruvarac who graduated from the University of Vienna, became a high official in the Serbian Government. His younger brother, Dimitrije Ruvarac, was also a prominent historian and an Orthodox priest, besides being a politician and a publisher.

Ilarion Ruvarac, like many of his Serbian peers of his day, spoke several languages, Latin, Greek, German, Hungarian, Rumanian, and Italian.

Historiography

In 1887 a serious intellectual debate was being waged between adherents of old, traditionalist and romantic schools in Serbian historiography, represented by historians Panta Srećković and Miloš Milojević, and the advocates of the new, critical and realistic school, headed by Ilarion Ruvarac and Ljubomir Kovačević.

Ruvarac was the first to make a name for himself as a historian who sought justice and truth in every critical work he undertook. He used scientific approaches to refute many deeply rooted and beloved legends, traditions about the treachery of Vuk Branković, the eternal freedom of Montenegro, and the death of Tsar Stefan Uroš V at the alleged hands of Vukašin Mrnjavčević. Ruvarac was the first to stress the use of primary sources as much as possible in order to obtain evidence of historical truth. He even questioned himself, more often than not, when critically examining historical texts, asking how they were obtained, who had written them and when, and for what purpose.

Being pitilessly conscientious and of cynical, sharp wit, Ruvarac exposed many Montenegrin fables that some wished to palm off as historical facts—either for personal, political gain, dynastic reasons (Habsburgs, Vatican, Ottomans), or simply to flatter their own vanity. Ruvarac ushered in a revision of all historical inconsistencies written by foreigners or inspired by them concerning Serbs of Montenegro and other regions, destroying one ill-conceived legend after another with no less passion than had those who fabricated them in the first place. Ruvarac, like most intellectuals, knew that so-called events can exert influence even though they never occurred.

He also proved that the so-called massacres as described in Njegoš's The Mountain Wreath and in the Montenegrin histories of that period, had never taken place. He knew that Njegoš used poetic license to create a drama in which he could get his ideas across. Ruvarac was right only in that he denounced such speculation as being unauthenticated and therefore unhistorical, as indeed they were.

Ruvarac had good reason sometimes to be exasperated by the inaccuracies and fabrications of histories because they were written by foreigners who perpetuated all kinds of stories and myths without researching Venetian archives. It was the Republic of Venice, after all, which had lorded it over the Adriatic coast and fought over it with the Turks for some four centuries (not to mention the French, Austrians, Hungarians, and the intrigue of the Vatican, each with their own political agenda).

Most of Ruvarac's career was spent mercilessly struggling with national myth which distorted the historical truth, but there was no turning back after him since he inspired other historians to investigate the past with a critical eye. The tradition of Ruvarac's scholarship and the critical method was carried on by Stojan Novaković (1842–1915), Ljubomir Kovačević (1848–1918), Mihailo Gavrilović, Stanoje Stanojević and many others. Jovan Radonić dedicated his first book to Ilarion Ruvarac honoring him for the introduction of the critical approach to Serbian historiography.

Legacy
He is included in The 100 most prominent Serbs.

Selected works 
O pećkim patrijarsima od Makarija do Arsenija III, 1868, 1879.
Stari Slankamen, 1892.
Dvije bosanske kraljice 1893.
Banovanje Tvrtka bana 1333. do 1377, 1894.
Montenegrina, prilošci istoriji Crne Gore, 1898.
O humskim episkopima i hercegovačkim mitropolitima do godine 1766, 1901.
Raški episkopi i mitropoliti  1901.

References

Further reading

External links 
 Short biography on SANU web site

1832 births
1905 deaths
People from Sremska Mitrovica
Members of the Serbian Learned Society
Serb priests
19th-century Serbian historians
20th-century Serbian historians
People from the Principality of Serbia
People from the Kingdom of Serbia
Archimandrites
19th-century Eastern Orthodox clergy
20th-century Eastern Orthodox clergy
Burials at Serbian Orthodox monasteries and churches